Penelope is a bird genus in the family Cracidae consisting of a number of large turkey-like arboreal species, the typical guans.  The range of these species is in forests from southern Mexico to tropical South America.  These large birds have predominantly brown plumage and have relatively small heads when compared to the size of their bodies; they also bear a characteristic dewlap.  Body lengths are typically 65 to 95 centimeters.

Most of the genus members have a typically raucous honking call.  A number of the genus members are endangered species and at least one is critically endangered, usually due to tropical deforestation and hunting.  In the case of several species the estimated populations are as low as a few 1000 mature birds, spread over a considerable area.  Because of the scarcity of many of the genus members and also due to the habitat being often in deep or high altitude forests, little is known about some of the species habits and reproduction; in fact, some species are found at altitudes up to 3350 meters.  Nests are typically built of twigs in trees.

This genus seems to have originated as part of the southward expansion of guans through the Andes and across tropical South America. Its closest relatives are probably the piping-guans, Aburria. These genera's ancestors apparently diverged some time during the Burdigalian, 20-15 mya, but this is not corroborated by fossil evidence (Pereira et al. 2002).

Species

References

Pereira, Sérgio Luiz; Baker, Allan J.& Wajntal, Anita (2002): Combined nuclear and mitochondrial DNA sequences resolve generic relationships within the Cracidae (Galliformes, Aves). Systematic Biology 51(6): 946–958.   PDF fulltext

 
Bird genera
Guans (bird)
Birds of Central America
Birds of South America
Taxa named by Blasius Merrem